The 1996 Wake Forest Demon Deacons football team was an American football team that represented Wake Forest University during the 1996 NCAA Division I-A football season. In their fourth season under head coach Jim Caldwell, the Demon Deacons compiled a 3–8 record and finished in a tie for sixth place in the Atlantic Coast Conference.

Schedule

Roster

Team leaders

References

Wake Forest
Wake Forest Demon Deacons football seasons
Wake Forest Demon Deacons football